Epidola is a genus of moths in the family Gelechiidae.

Species
Epidola barcinonella Milliere, 1867
Epidola lilyella Lucas, 1945
Epidola melitensis Amsel, 1955
Epidola nuraghella Hartig, 1939
Epidola semitica Amsel, 1942
Epidola stigma Staudinger, 1859

Status unknown
Epidola grisea Amsel, 1942, described from Sardinia.

References

 
Apatetrini